Crowdsourced testing is an emerging trend in software testing which exploits the benefits, effectiveness, and efficiency of crowdsourcing and the cloud platform. It differs from traditional testing methods in that the testing is carried out by a number of different testers from different places, and not by hired consultants and professionals. The software is put to test under diverse realistic platforms which makes it more reliable, cost-effective, and can be fast. In addition, crowdsource testing can allow for remote usability testing because specific target groups can be recruited through the crowd.

This method of testing is considered when the software is more user-centric: i.e., software whose success is determined by its user feedback and which has a diverse user space. It is frequently implemented with gaming, mobile applications, when experts who may be difficult to find in one place are required for specific testing, or when the company lacks the resources or time to carry out the testing internally.

Crowdsourced testing vs. Outsourced testing 
Crowdsourced testing may be considered to be a sub-type of software testing outsourcing.

While for some projects it may be possible to get away with only using one approach or the other, a more thorough approach would use a more diverse software testing method,  which uses both a dedicated testing team in addition to the crowd. Crowdsource testing is best for things like beta and compatibility testing, which are necessary final steps for testing; however, most software is far too complex for late-stage testing like this to cover all of the possible issues. A dedicated outsourced or in-house testing team will give a better idea of the software's possible defects, but will not give anywhere near the scope of crowdtesting. Therefore, a good solution is to integrate multiple test teams into any development project (and also to develop with the principles of testability in mind from the very beginning.)

Crowdsourcing alone may not give the best feedback on applications. A diverse testing approach that pools both crowdsource testing and a dedicated testing team may be favorable. "Having this diversity of staffing allows you to scale your resources up and down in a fluid manner, meeting tight deadlines during peak periods of development and testing, while controlling costs during slow periods."

References 

 

Crowdsourcing
Software testing